This article provides details of international football games played by the Saudi Arabia national football team from 2020 to present.

Results

2020

2021

2022

2023

Head to head records

References

2020
2020s in Saudi Arabian sport